Sharsheret (lit. Chain) is a religious moshav in southern Israel. Located near Netivot and covering 6,000 dunams, it falls under the jurisdiction of Sdot Negev Regional Council.

History
The village was established in 1951 with the help of the Jewish Agency for Israel by Bnei Akiva members who were immigrants from Tunisia . Its name is a combination of two words, Sar (lit. Minister, written with a Shin, and therefore also pronounceable as "Shar") and Sharett (referring to Moshe Sharett, who was Foreign Minister at the time the moshav was founded).

References

Moshavim
Religious Israeli communities
Populated places established in 1951
1951 establishments in Israel
Populated places in Southern District (Israel)
Tunisian-Jewish culture in Israel